"People Grinnin'" is a 2016 single released by the Australian duo Nervo, which features the vocals of The Child of Lov, who died in 2013. The song reached number one on the Billboard Dance Club Songs Chart during the week ending 3 December 2016.

The track and its music video (which is part of their "Made by Me" campaign to help address the gender disparity and skills shortage in the field of engineering) is dedicated to women pursuing a career in the world of technology, and was inspired by their experiences in this field. In an interview with Your EDM, the sisters explain how they came up with the song: "When we studied engineering, we were the only girls in the class. So when we were approached to get behind this project it just made sense. We loved the chance to show the world that there is engineering in every aspect of our lives. We're sound engineers but our whole show is only made possible through expert engineering. From the makeup we wear to the lights and the stage we perform on; engineering makes it all possible, including the music we make."

Track listing

Charts

References

External links
 

2016 singles
2016 songs
Nervo (DJs) songs
Atlantic Records singles
Big Beat Records (American record label) singles
Electronic songs
House music songs
Song recordings produced by Nervo (DJs)
Songs with feminist themes
Songs written by Miriam Nervo
Songs written by Olivia Nervo
Warner Records singles